"Pick Up the Phone" is the second single from the 2002 album Neon Golden by German electronica band The Notwist.

Track listing
"Pick Up the Phone" – 3:55
"Red Room" – 6:11
"This Room (RMX by Four Tet & Manitoba)" – 8:05
"Pick Up the Phone (Video)"

In other media
"Pick Up the Phone" was featured in "Betty and Veronica", an episode of the television series Veronica Mars.

References

2002 singles
Electronic songs
2002 songs
Virgin Records singles
Songs about telephone calls